James Turner (born February 16, 1962) is a former American football Linebacker in the National Football League for the Dallas Cowboys. He played college football at Presbyterian College.

Early years
Turner attended Vienna High School in Georgia, where he practiced football, basketball and track.

He accepted a football scholarship from Presbyterian College. He was a three-year starter at defensive end, before being moved to outside linebacker as a senior. He also practiced track.

Professional career
Turner was signed as an undrafted free agent by the Dallas Cowboys after the 1984 NFL draft. He was waived on August 27. On November 14, he was re-signed after the team released wide receiver Harold Carmichael, to provide depth at the linebacker position. He only played on special teams and was cut on August 19, 1985.

Personal life
He is the founder of Turner Financial Group.

References

1962 births
Living people
People from Vienna, Georgia
Players of American football from Georgia (U.S. state)
American football linebackers
Presbyterian Blue Hose football players
Dallas Cowboys players